Wide Open Town is a 1941 American Western film directed by Lesley Selander and written by Harrison Jacobs and J. Benton Cheney. The film stars William Boyd, Russell Hayden, Andy Clyde, Evelyn Brent, Victor Jory, Morris Ankrum and Cara Williams. The film was released on August 8, 1941, by Paramount Pictures.

This film marked Bernice Kay's feature film debut. She appeared in later films as Cara Williams.

Plot
Hoppy along with Lucky and California are looking for their stolen cattle and arrive in a town run by outlaws lead by Belle Langtry, after stopping the gang's attempt to damage the local printing business, Hoppy is made sheriff. Then Hoppy sets a trap to catch one of the rustlers, but lets him go with hope that he will lead Hoppy to the rest of the gang.

Cast 
 William Boyd as Hopalong Cassidy
 Russell Hayden as Lucky Jenkins
 Andy Clyde as California Carlson
 Evelyn Brent as Belle Langtry
 Victor Jory as Steve Fraser
 Morris Ankrum as Jim Stuart
 Cara Williams as Joan Stuart
 Kenneth Harlan as Tom Wilson
 Roy Barcroft as Henchman Red
 Glenn Strange as Henchman Ed Stark
 Ed Cassidy as Brad Jackson
 Jack Rockwell as Rancher

References

External links 
 
 
 
 

1941 films
American black-and-white films
1940s English-language films
Paramount Pictures films
American Western (genre) films
1941 Western (genre) films
Films directed by Lesley Selander
Hopalong Cassidy films
1940s American films